Samuel Sherwood Edmonston  (August 30, 1883 – April 12, 1979) was a pitcher in Major League Baseball, who played in one game for the Washington Senators in 1907. He also attended Georgetown University. At the time of his death, Edmonston was the oldest living former major league player.

External links

1883 births
1979 deaths
Major League Baseball pitchers
Washington Senators (1901–1960) players
Wilmington Peaches players
Altoona Mountaineers players
Richmond Colts players
Trenton Tigers players
Baseball players from Washington, D.C.
Georgetown University alumni
Concord Marines players